Margaret Beryl Jones, Baroness Jones of Whitchurch (born 22 May 1955) is a British Labour Peer and previously a trade union official and Labour politician. She was Chair of the Labour Party from 2000 to 2001.

Early life
Jones was born in Cardiff to Bill and Audrey Jones, and was educated at Whitchurch High School. She then studied at the University of Sussex, gaining a BA in Sociology.  She now lives in Hove.

Non-political positions
Jones was Director of Policy and Public Affairs of the trade union UNISON until 2006.  In 1979 she became a regional official of National Union of Public Employees (NUPE), which merged into UNISON.

She has a background as a housing campaigner and environmentalist as well as fighting low pay and discrimination at work. She was previously a trustee of Shelter and the Waste & Resources Action Programme as well as being on the board of the Circle 33 Housing Trust. She has been a Development Board member of ClientEarth, board member of Ombudsman Services, Chair of Rothamsted Enterprises, and President of Friends of the South Downs.

Labour Party positions
Jones was a member of the Labour Party's National Executive Committee (NEC) within the trade union section from 1993 to 2005. She was elected Chair of the Labour Party in 2000, the year the Prime Minister Tony Blair controversially appointed Charles Clarke to be the similarly named Party Chairman. She was co-convener, along with Tony Blair, of the NEC Joint Policy Committee for much of her time on the NEC.

Parliamentary candidate for Blaenau Gwent
Jones was the Labour Party parliamentary candidate for the constituency of Blaenau Gwent at the 2005 general election, the safest Labour seat in Wales, and fifth safest in the UK. She was selected from a women-only shortlist which was controversially imposed upon the local party; subsequently eight of twelve members of the local executive resigned in protest. The retiring MP Llew Smith also criticised the selection method.

Peter Law, the Labour Welsh Assembly Member for the constituency, resigned from the party and stood against her as an Independent. Prior to the announcement of Law's rumoured candidacy, Jones stated that Law would be "very foolish" to stand against her. She argued "Blaenau Gwent is solidly Labour and I don't think people will vote for anyone else."

Law won the seat with a majority of 9,121 votes, creating one of the media highlights of the election. The Daily Telegraph described Jones' defeat as "one of the most spectacular general election results of modern times".

Peerage and Shadow Minister
Following her election defeat, Jones was nominated for a Life Peerage in 2005 by the Labour Party, according to a list leaked to The Times. This leaked list eventually led to the Cash for Peerages scandal in which Jones was not implicated. On 10 April 2006, her nomination for a peerage was officially announced, and she was gazetted as Baroness Jones of Whitchurch, of Whitchurch in the County of South Glamorgan on 5 June 2006. Jones' peerage was widely criticised, with Law stating "That is the way New Labour works. It's a poor example of patronage and power." Labour MP Paul Flynn was also critical, he argued: "This is standing democracy on its head. The House of Lords shouldn't be used to reward a candidate who has been emphatically rejected by the electorate."

In June 2010 Jones joined Labour's Shadow Ministerial Team, as Labour's House of Lords spokeswoman on Culture, Olympics, Media and Sport. She was then promoted to the Shadow Education Minister. Since 2015 she has been Labour's Shadow Environment Minister in the Lords.

In 2020, Lady Jones was appointed as a member of the South Downs National Park Authority.

References

External links
Labour Party profile

1955 births
Living people
Welsh trade unionists
Labour Party (UK) officials
Jones of Whitchurch
Life peeresses created by Elizabeth II
Alumni of the University of Sussex
People educated at Whitchurch Grammar School, Cardiff
Chairs of the Labour Party (UK)
Women trade unionists
Politicians from Cardiff